Konechnaya is a rural locality (a village) in Slobodskoye Rural Settlement, Kharovsky District, Vologda Oblast, Russia. The population was 10 as of 2002.

Geography 
Konechnaya is located 32 km northeast of Kharovsk (the district's administrative centre) by road. Mishutikha is the nearest rural locality.

References 

Rural localities in Kharovsky District